P53 road is a regional road (P-Highway) in Zakarpattia Oblast, Ukraine. It runs north-south and connects Malyi Bereznyi with a Slovakia-Ukraine border. It is one of the shortest routes. 

It is also called Ublianska vulytsia (Ubl'a Street). It stretches along Ublia River that south of Malyi Bereznyi falls into Uzh River.

Main route
Main route and connections to/intersections with other highways in Ukraine.

See also

 Roads in Ukraine

References

External links
Regional Roads in Ukraine in Russian

Roads in Zakarpattia Oblast